Harry Newell may refer to:

 Harry Newell (actor), appeared in the 2003 film Peter Pan
 Harry Newell (fireboat), stationed in Ketchikan, Alaska, named after a firefighter who died in the line of duty in 1955